Rudolph Arroyo (born June 19, 1950) is a former Major League Baseball pitcher who played for one season. He pitched for the St. Louis Cardinals in nine games during the 1971 St. Louis Cardinals season.

External links

1950 births
Living people
Major League Baseball pitchers
St. Louis Cardinals players
Lewiston Broncs players
Arkansas Travelers players
Tulsa Oilers (baseball) players
Bakersfield Dodgers players
Waterbury Dodgers players
St. Petersburg Cardinals players
Foothill College alumni
Baseball players from New York City
Junior college baseball players in the United States